The Fernando Montes de Oca Fencing Hall is an indoor sports venue located in the Magdalena Mixhuca Sports City area of Mexico City. It hosted the fencing competitions and the fencing part of the modern pentathlon competition of the 1968 Summer Olympics.

The Olympic Fencing Hall was built between November 13, 1967, and September, 1968, in the Magdalena Mixhuca Sports City. The 310-by-210-foot rectangular structure is covered by a convex roof of corrugated asbestos supported by steel cables. The ground floor had 15 fencing strips—each of which was provided with a two-sided scoreboard, a judges' podium and a control table—and 37 cubicles for competitors. On the south side were facilities for the press, dressing rooms, etc. The north side housed offices, a lounge, a
warm-up area and additional dressing rooms and service areas. On the upper floor were grandstands with a seating capacity of 3,000.

References
1968 Summer Olympics official report. Volume 2. Part 1. p. 74.

Venues of the 1968 Summer Olympics
Indoor arenas in Mexico
Olympic fencing venues
Olympic modern pentathlon venues
Sports venues in Mexico City
Sports venues completed in 1968